Pseudotrapelus is an African and Asian genus of agamid lizards.

Species
Listed alphabetically by specific name.

Nota bene: A binomial authority in parentheses indicates that the species was originally described in a genus other than Pseudotrapelus.

References

Further reading
 (1843). Systema Reptilium, Fasciculus Primus, Amblyglossae. Vienna: Braumüller & Seidel. 106 pp. + indices. (Acanthocercus, new genus, p. 84). (in Latin).

External links
 (2008): Animal Diversity Web - Genus Acanthocercus. Retrieved 2008-MAR-20.

 
Lizard genera
Agamid lizards of Africa
Taxa named by Leopold Fitzinger